The black-billed turaco (Tauraco schuettii) is a medium-sized turaco, an endemic family to sub-Saharan Africa. It is a resident breeder in the forests of central Africa, found in the Democratic Republic of Congo, Uganda, West Kenya, Burundi, Rwanda and South Sudan.

Description
Adult similar to green turaco, distinguished by small all-black bill and rounded whitish crest. Both the male and female defend a territory and share incubation duties.

Its call is a distinctive feature of the forests of the Congo, a resonant kwah khaw kwah. In areas where its range overlaps with the Rwenzori turaco it will aggressively respond to the calls of that species.

It is a widespread species and is not threatened globally (CITES II).

References

 Del Hoyo, Elliott and Sargatal (editors), Handbook of the Birds of the World, Vol 4, 

black-billed turaco
Birds of Central Africa
black-billed turaco
black-billed turaco